Pegunungan Bintang Regency or Bintang Mountains Regency is a regency in the Indonesian province of Highland Papua. It covers an area of 15,683 km2, and had a population of 65,434 at the 2010 Census and 77,872 at the 2020 Census. The administrative centre is Oksibil.

Name
Pegunungan Bintang is the Indonesian name for the Star Mountains, a mountain range that is also shared by Papua New Guinea. Similarly, Star Mountains Rural LLG in Western Province, Papua New Guinea is also named after the mountain range.

Languages
The Yetfa and Murkim languages are spoken in the eponymous Yetfa and Murkim districts. Other indigenous Papuan languages of Pegunungan Bintang Regency are Lepki (Lepki-Murkim family), Kimki (isolate), Towei (Pauwasi), Emem (Pauwasi), and Burumakok (Ok, Trans-New Guinea).

Administrative Districts
The Bintang Mountains Regency comprises thirty-four districts (distrik), tabulated below with their areas and their populations at the 2010 Census and 2020 Census. The table also includes the location of the districts' administrative centres.

The number of districts increased dramatically prior to 2010, created by the division of the six original districts (whose names are given in bold above).

Kawor, Tarup, and Awinbon were created from parts of Iwur District
Pepera, Alemsom, Serambakon, Kolomdol, Oksop, Ok Sebang (formerly Sebang), Ok Bape, and Ok Aon were created from parts of Oksibil District
Bime, Epumek, Weime, Pamek, Nongme, and Batani were created from parts of Borme District
Aboy, Okbab, Teiraplu, and Yefta were created from parts of Okbi District
East Kiwirok, Okhika, Oklip, and Oksamol (formerly Warasamo) were created from parts of Kiwirok District
Murkim, Mofinop, and Okbemta were created from parts of Batom District

See also
Star Mountains

References

External links
Statistics publications from Statistics Indonesia (BPS)

Regencies of Highland Papua